Francisco Brennand is a 2012 Brazilian documentary film directed by Mariana Brennand Fortes, about Francisco Brennand, a plastic artist who lives and works in isolation in his workshop in a neighborhood away from Recife.

The film shows the particular universe of the artist, who at 80 years decided to break the silence to reveal the secrets of his art and his life inside his ceramic workshop.

References

External links
 
 

Brazilian documentary films
Brazilian biographical films
2012 documentary films
2012 films
Documentary films about visual artists